The Democratic Movement of Mozambique is a political party in Mozambique. Founded on 6 March 2009, it is led by Daviz Simango, who is the Mayor of Beira. It formed after breaking with RENAMO, the main opposition party.

2009 general election 
In the 28 October 2009 parliamentary election, the Mozambique Democratic Movement was not allowed to contest by the National Election Commission (Comissão Nacional de Eleições) in nine of the 13 voting constituencies on controversial procedural grounds. MDM secured 3.93% of the total vote and eight seats in the 250 member Assembly of the Republic. Daviz Simango was the MDM candidate in the presidential election held on the same day. He placed third with 8.59% of the total vote.

Electoral history

Presidential elections

Assembly elections

References

External links
 MDM official site

Political parties in Mozambique
Political parties established in 2008
Christian democratic parties in Africa
2008 in Mozambique
2009 establishments in Mozambique